Juan de Dios Ortúzar (born January 24, 1949) is Emeritus Professor at the Pontifical Catholic University of Chile, Santiago, Chile. He specializes in discrete choice models, valuation of externalities, design and collection of mobility and preference surveys and transportation forecasting. He received a B.Sc. in mathematics and a civil engineering degree at PUC, and an M.Sc. and Ph.D. from the University of Leeds.

Juan de Dios Ortúzar pioneered the development of discrete choice modelling techniques and their application to determine willingness-to-pay for reducing externalities (accidents, noise and pollution). His research has ventured into the interdisciplinary realm, with contributions in social housing, residential location, citizen security, college choice, work shifts, tourism, grey water reuse, and wine choice. In particular, the methodological advancements on valuation of externalities developed with his research team, have been applied in practice in Australia, Colombia, Germany, Norway and Spain. Founding member of the Institute in Complex Engineering Systems (2007); of the Chilean team leading the Centre of Excellence BRT+ (funded by the Volvo Research & Educational Foundations), with MIT, Sydney University, University of Pretoria and EMBARQ (2010), and of the Centre for Sustainable Urban Development (CEDEUS) at  the Pontifical Catholic University of Chile (2012), he also led the interdisciplinary project Understanding Wine Preferences with the Centre for Aromas and Flavours at PUC and the participation of the Beijing Agricultural University.

Recipient of a Doctor Honoris Causa (University of Cantabria, Spain) in 2018, the Life Achievement Award (International Association for Travel Behaviour Research) in 2012 and the Humboldt Research Award (Alexander von Humboldt Foundation) in 2010, Prof. Ortúzar has formed several generations of professionals and specialists with a profound service vocation (including 18 Ph.D. and 50 M.Sc.), who work in academia, government and professional practice in Chile, Latin America and Europe.

He has published over 200 papers in archival journals and book chapters. Co-author of Modelling Transport, a book published by Wiley reflecting the state-of-practice in this discipline, which has sold over 20,000 copies and is now in its fourth edition; the book has been translated into Italian (2004) and Spanish (2008). He also edited four international books and has two further books in Spanish dealing with travel demand models and econometrics of discrete choice. Prof. Ortúzar is co-author of Micro-GUTS, a simulation game to train urban planners, which is used by more than 50 academic institutions around the world. Finally, he was Co-Editor in Chief of Transportation Research A for 10 years and is a member of the editorial board of another seven archival journals.

Juan de Dios Ortúzar has managed or advised large transport studies in Latin America and Europe, involving the application of advanced travel demand modelling techniques, and the use of revealed and stated preference data. In particular, he directed the design and implementation work of large scale mobility surveys in Chile, such as those for Santiago in 1991 (33,000 households) and the Santiago on-going survey, that started in 2001–2002 with 15,000 households and interviewed another 5,000 households per year between 2004 and 2007. He also directed the Bogotá 2011 mobility survey, where more than 15,000 households were interviewed.

Books 
 Ortúzar, J. de D. (2015) Modelos de Demanda de Transporte. Second Enlarged Edition, Alfaomega, Bogota; Second Edition, 2000, First, 1994, Ediciones Universidad Católica, Santiago (in Spanish).
 Ortúzar, J. de D. and Willumsen, L.G. (2011) Modelling Transport. Fourth Edition, John Wiley and Sons, Chichester (Third Edition 2001, Second 1994, First 1990).
 Ortúzar, J. de D. and Willumsen, L.G. (2008) Modelos de Transporte. PUbliCan, Santander (translated to Spanish by A. Ibeas and L. Dell’Olio).
 Ortúzar, J. de D. and Willumsen, L.G. (2004) Pianificazione dei Sistema di Transporto. Editore Ulrico Hoepli, Milán (translated to Italian by E. Cherchi and I. Meloni).
 Ortúzar, J. de D. (2000) Modelos Econométricos de Elección Discreta. Ediciones Universidad Católica, Santiago (in Spanish).

Edited books 

 Greene, M. and Ortúzar, J. de D. (eds.) (2018) El Camino de Latinoamérica y el Caribe hacia la Sustentabilidad. Ediciones ARQ, Santiago (in Spanish).
 Ortúzar, J. de D. (ed.) (2000) Stated Preference Modelling Techniques. Perspectives 4, PTRC Education and Research Services Ltd., London.
 Ortúzar, J. de D., Hensher, D.A. and Jara-Díaz, S.R. (eds.) (1998) Travel Behaviour Research: Updating the State of Play. Pergamon, Oxford.
 Ortúzar, J. de D. (ed.) (1992) Simplified Transport Demand Modelling. Perspectives 2, PTRC Education and Research Services Ltd., London.

More cited publications  
 Ortúzar, J. de D. and Willumsen, L.G. (2011) Modelling Transport. John Wiley and Sons, Chichester.
 Caussade, S., Ortúzar, J. de D., Rizzi, L.I. and Hensher, D.A. (2005) Assessing the influence of design dimensions on stated choice experiment estimates.Transportation Research Part B: Methodological 39. 621–640.
 Sillano, M. and Ortúzar, J. de D. (2005) Willingness-to-pay estimation with mixed logit models: some new evidence.Environment and Planning 37. 525–550.
 Williams, H.C.W.L. and Ortúzar, J. de D. (1982) Behavioural theories of dispersion and the mis-specification of travel demand models.Transportation Research Part B: Methodological 16. 167–219.
 Ortúzar, J. de D., Iacobelli, A. and Valeze, C. (2000) Estimating demand for a cycle-way network.Transportation Research Part A: Policy and Practice 34. 353–373.
 Rizzi, L.I. and Ortúzar, J. de D. (2003) Stated preference in the valuation of interurban road safety. Accident Analysis and Prevention 35. 9-22.
 Yáñez M.F., Raveau, S. and Ortúzar, J. de D. (2010) Inclusion of latent variables in mixed logit models: modelling and forecasting. Transportation Research Part A: Policy and Practice 44. 744–753.
 Gaudry, M.J.I., Jara-Díaz, S.R. and Ortúzar, J. de D. (1989) Value of time sensitivity to model specification.Transportation Research Part B: Methodological 23. 151–158.
 Iragüen, P. and Ortúzar, J. de D. (2004) Willingness-to-pay for reducing fatal accidents risk in urban areas: an internet-based web page stated preference survey. Accident Analysis and Prevention 36. 513–524.
 Cantillo, V. and Ortúzar, J. de D. (2005) A semi-compensatory discrete choice model with explicit attribute thresholds of perception. Transportation Research Part B: Methodological 39. 641–657.

Recent papers 
 Guerrero, T.E., Guevara, C.A., Cherchi, E. and Ortúzar, J. de D. (2022) Characterizing the impact of discrete indicators to correct for endogeneity in discrete choice models. Journal of Choice Modelling 42, 100342doi.org/10.1016/j.jocm.2021.100342.
 Guzmán, L.A., Arellana, J., Cantillo-García, V. and Ortúzar, J. de D. (2021) Revisiting the benefits of combining data of a different nature: strategic forecasting of new mode alternatives. Journal of Advanced Transportation 2021doi.org/10.1155/2021/6672961.
 Amaris, G., Dawson, R., Gironás, J., Hess, S. and Ortúzar, J. de D. (2021) From mathematical models to policy design: predicting greywater reuse scheme effectiveness and water reclamation benefits based on individuals’ preferences. Sustainable Cities and Society 74 doi.org/10.1016/j.scs.2021.103132.
 Lizana, P., Ortúzar, J. de D., Arellana, J. and Rizzi, L.I. (2021) Forecasting with a joint mode/time of day choice model based on combined RP and SC data. Transportation Research Part 150A, 302-316.
 Guerrero, T.E., Guevara, C.A., Cherchi, E. and Ortúzar, J. de D. (2021) Forecasting with strategic transport models corrected for endogeneity. Transportmetrica A: Transport Science doi.org/10.1080/23249935.2021.1891154.
 Grisolía, J.M., López, F.J. and Ortúzar, J. de D (2021) Is there room for a room-tax in the Canary Islands? International Journal of Tourism Research 23, 743-756.
 Ortúzar, J. de D., Bascuñán, R., Rizzi, L.I. and Salata, A. (2021) Assessing the potential acceptability of road pricing in Santiago. Transportation Research 144A, 153-169.
 Amaris, G., Gironás, J., Hess, S. and Ortúzar, J. de D. (2021) Capturing and analysing heterogeneity in residential greywater reuse preferences using a latent class model. Journal of Environmental Management 279, 111673 doi.org/10.1016/j.jenvman.2020.111673.
 Amaris, G., Hess, S., Gironás, J. y Ortúzar, J. de D. (2021) Using hybrid choice models to capture the impact of attitudes on residential greywater reuse preferences. Resources Conservation and Recycling 164doi.org/10.1016/j.resconrec.2020.105171.
 Bahamonde-Birke, F.J. and Ortúzar, J. de D. (2021) How to categorize individuals on the basis of underlying attitudes? A discussion on latent variables, latent classes and hybrid choice models. Transportmetrica A: Transport Science 17, 856-877.
 Bonet, L., Greene, M. and Ortúzar, J. de D. (2020) Subjective valuation of tangible and intangible heritage neighbourhood attributes. Habitat International 105, 102249 doi.org/10.1016/j.habitatint.2020.102249.
 Amaris, G., Dawson, R., Gironás, J., Hess, S. and Ortúzar, J. de D. (2020) Understanding the preferences for different types of urban greywater uses and the impact of qualitative attributes. Water Research 184 doi.org/10.1016/j.watres.2020.116007
 Guerrero, T.E., Guevara, C.A., Cherchi, E. and Ortúzar, J. de D. (2020) Addressing endogeneity in strategic urban mode choice models. Transportation 48, 2081-2102.
 Gutierrez, M., Cantillo, V., Arellana, J. and Ortúzar, J. de D. (2020) Estimating bicycle demand in an aggressive environment. International Journal of Sustainable Transportation 15, 259-272.
 Vallejo-Borda, J.A., Ortiz-Ramírez, H.A., Rodríguez-Valencia, A., Hurtubia, R. and Ortúzar, J. de D. (2020) Forecasting the quality of service of Bogota’s sidewalks from pedestrian perceptions: an ordered probit MIMIC approach. Transportation Research Record 2674, 205-216
 Guerrero, T.E., Ortúzar, J. de D. and Raveau, S. (2020) Traffic accident risk perception among drivers: a latent variable approach. Transportation Planning and Technology 43, 313-324.
 Allen, J., Eboli, L., Mazzulla, G. and Ortúzar, J. de D. (2020) Effect of critical incidents on public transport satisfaction and loyalty: an Ordinal Probit SEM-MIMIC approach. Transportation 47, 827–863.
 Gutierrez, M., Hurtubia, R. and Ortúzar, J. de D. (2020) The role of habit and the built environment in the willingness to commute by bicycle. Travel Behaviour and Society 20. 62–73.
 Allen, J., Muñoz, J.C. and Ortúzar, J. de D. (2020) On the effect of operational service attributes on transit satisfaction. Transportation 47, 2307-2336.
 Ortúzar, J. de D. (2019) Sustainable urban mobility: what can be done to achieve it? Journal of the Indian Institute of Science 99, 683-693.
 Allen, J., Muñoz, J.C. and Ortúzar, J. de D. (2019) On evasion behaviour in public transport: dissatisfaction or contagion? Transportation Research Part A: Policy and Practice 130, 626–651.
 Schmidt, A., Ortúzar, J. de D. and Paredes, R.D. (2019) Heterogeneity and college choice: latent class modelling for improved policy making. Journal of Choice Modelling 33    https://doi.org/10.1016/j.jocm.2019.100185
 Modak, N.M., Merigó, J.M., Weber, R., Manzor, F. and Ortúzar, J. de D. (2019) Fifty years of Transportation Research journals: a bibliometric overview. Transportation Research 120A, 188-223.
 Allen, J., Muñoz, J.C. and Ortúzar, J. de D. (2019) Understanding public transport satisfaction: using Maslow's hierarchy of (transit) needs. Transport Policy 81, 75–94.
 González, R.M., Román, C. and Ortúzar, J. de D. (2019) Preferences for sustainable mobility in natural areas: the case of Teide National Park. Journal of Transport Geography 76, 42–51.
 Allen, J., Eboli, L., Forciniti, C., Mazzulla, G. and Ortúzar, J. de D. (2019) The role of critical incidents and involvement in transit satisfaction and loyalty. Transport Policy 75, 57–69.
 Flügel, S., Veisten, K., Rizzi, L.I., Ortúzar, J. de D. and Elvik, R. (2019) A comparison of bus passengers’ and car drivers’ valuation of casualty risk reductions in their routes. Accident Analysis and Prevention 122, 63–75.
 Cordera, R., dell’Olio, L., Ibeas, A. and Ortúzar, J. de D. (2019) Demand for environmentally friendly vehicles: a review and new evidence. International Journal of Sustainable Transportation 13, 210–223.
 Domarchi, C., Coeymans, J.E. and Ortúzar, J. de D. (2018) Shared taxis: modelling the choice of a paratransit mode in Santiago de Chile. Transportation 46, 2243–2268.
 Allen, J., Muñoz, J.C. and Ortúzar, J. de D. (2018) Modelling service-specific and global transit satisfaction under travel and user heterogeneity. Transportation Research Part A: Policy and Practice 113, 509–528.
 González-Valdés, F. and Ortúzar, J. de D. (2018) The stochastic satisficing model: a bounded rationality discrete choice model. Journal of Choice Modelling 27, 74-87.
 González, R.M., Román, C., Amador, F.J., Rizzi, L.I., Ortúzar, J. de D., Espino, R., Martin, J.C. and Cherchi, E. (2018) Estimating the value of risk reductions for car drivers when pedestrians are involved: a case study in Spain. Transportation 45, 499–521.
 Palma, D.E., Ortúzar, J. de D., Rizzi, L.I. and Casaubon, G. (2018) Modelling consumers’ heterogeneous preferences: a case study with Chilean wine consumers. Australian Journal of Grape and Wine Research 24, 51–61.
 Greene, M., Mora, R., Figueroa, C., Waintrub, N. and Ortúzar, J. de D. (2017) Towards a sustainable city: applying urban renewal incentives according to the social and urban characteristics of the area. Habitat International 68, 15–23.
 Bahamonde-Birke, F.J. and Ortúzar, J. de D. (2017) Analysing the continuity of attitudinal and perceptual indicators in hybrid choice models. Journal of Choice Modelling 25, 28–39.
 Cherchi, E., Cirillo, C. and Ortúzar, J. de D. (2017) Modelling correlation patterns in mode choice models estimated on multiday travel data. Transportation Research 96A, 146–153.
 Bahamonde-Birke, F.J., Kunert, U., Link, H. and Ortúzar, J. de D. (2017) About attitudes and perceptions – finding the proper way to consider latent variables in discrete choice models. Transportation 44, 475–493.
 Bahamonde-Birke, F.J., Navarro. I. and Ortúzar, J. de D. (2017) If you choose not to decide, you still have made a choice. Journal of Choice Modelling 22,13–23.
 Jensen, A.F., Cherchi, E., Mabit, S.L. and Ortúzar, J. de D. (2017) Predicting the potential market for electric vehicles. Transportation Science 51, 427–444.
 Guarda, P., Galilea, P., Handy, S., Muñoz, J.C. and Ortúzar, J. de D. (2016) Decreasing fare evasion without fines? A microeconomic analysis. Research in Transportation Economics 59, 151-158.   
 Batarce, M., Muñoz, J.C and Ortúzar, J. de D. (2016) Value crowding in public transport: implications for cost-benefit analysis. Transportation Research 91A, 358–378.
 Guarda, P., Galilea, P., Paget-Seekins, L. and Ortúzar, J. de D. (2016) What is behind fare evasion in urban bus systems? An econometric approach. Transportation Research 84A, 55–71.
 Palma, D.E., Ortúzar, J. de D., Rizzi, L.I., Guevara, C.A., Casaubon, G. and Ma, H. (2016) Modelling choice when price is a cue for quality: a case study with Chinese consumers. Journal of Choice Modelling 19, 24–39.
 Waintrub, N., Greene, M. and Ortúzar, J. de D. (2016) Designing incentive packages for increased density and social inclusion in the neighbourhood of mass transit stations. Habitat International 55, 133–147.

Directories 
Juan de Dios Ortúzar is active in several national and international boards and committees.
 Advisory Committee, Institute of Transport and Logistics Studies: Australian Key Center in Transport Management (board member since its establishment in 1996).
 Academia de Ingeniería de Chile (Number Member, since its creation in 2010).
 International Association for Travel Behaviour Research (board member 1985-1999 and from 2005 onwards, co-vice-chairman 2010–2012, co-chairman 2012–2014).
 Chilean Society of Transport Engineering (Founding Partner and Past President).

He has also participated in the following Directories:
 Scientific Advisory Board, HIGH-TOOL Project, Karlsruhe Institut für Technologie (2014-2017).
 Scientific and Business Directorate, Aromas and Flavours Centre, DICTUC S.A. (2013-2016).
 Executive Board, BRT+ (2010-2017).
 Head, Department of Transport Engineering, PUC, (1990-1992), (1994-1998) and (2005-2009).
 International Steering Committee for Travel Survey Conferences, ISCTSC (since its inception in 1998).
 International Board Member, Association for European Transport (1999-2009).
 Director of Research and Postgraduate Studies, School of Engineering, PUC, (1992-1994).
 International Board member, PTRC Education and Research Services Ltd. (1982-1998).

Major honours and awards 
 2021 Eduardo Charreau Award, granted annually by the Argentine Association for the Progress of Science the Interscience Association and the Organization of American States, for the excellent trajectory of Iberoamerican cooperation and remarkable scientific production.
 2018 Doctor Honoris Causa, University of Cantabria, Spain.
 2017 Medal of Honour of Academic, Scientific and Business Merit, North University, Colombia, which recognizes the academic and scientific work of the winner.
 2016 Professor Emeritus, Pontifical Catholic University of Chile.
 2013 Distinguished Transport Lecturer, University of Hong Kong.
 2012 IATBR Life Achievement Award, granted every three years by the International Association for Travel Behaviour Research, to honour the trajectory of the recipient (first non-English speaker to receive it).
 2012 FONDECYT Award 30 years, awarded by the National Commission of Science and Technology of Chile, for having been awarded 13 successive research projects since the beginning of the contest.
 2010 Humboldt Research Award, granted by the Alexander von Humboldt Foundation of Germany, in recognition of the trajectory and importance of the award-winning researcher (third Chilean to receive it).
 2010 UC Engineering Award, awarded biannually by the School of Engineering UC , for the outstanding academic career of the winner (first to receive it).

Keynote conferences 
He has presented over 150 papers at International Conferences and more than 100 at Regional Conferences. He has also been a Guest Speaker (Keynote Speaker) at the following in the last six years:
 Ortúzar, J. de D. (2022) Role of habitat and the built environment in the willingness to commute by bicycle. 4thBridging Transportation Researchers (BTR) Conference. Online Conference, 4–5 August.
 Ortúzar, J. de D. (2022) Movilidad urbana sustentable: rol de la tarificación por congestión. XVI Congreso Internacional de Ingeniería Civil. Querétaro, 3–4 May.
 Ortúzar, J. de D. (2019) Habit and latent constructs in bicycle demand modelling. 7th International Conference on Transportation and Space Time Economics. Beijing, 11–13 October.
Ortúzar, J. de D. (2019) Recent advances in modelling travellers’ responses to TDM. 9th International Symposium on Travel Demand Management. Edinburgh, 19–21 June.
Ortúzar, J. de D. (2019) Recent advances in modelling customer behaviour for market analysis. 10th International Forum on Shipping, Ports and Airports (IFSPA) 2019, Hong Kong, 20–24 May.
Ortúzar, J. de D. (2017) Transportation planning: historical development and future challenges. XII Colombian Congress of Transportation and Traffic Engineering, Bogotá, 23–25 October.
Ortúzar, J. de D. (2016) Valuation of intangibles: how to measure the unmeasurable. European Transport Conference, Barcelona, 5–7 October.
Ortúzar, J. de D. (2016) Road pricing: an impeccable policy – how can we sell it? International Workshop on Urban Traffic Congestion Mitigation: Advanced Models, Solutions and Challenges, Zhejian University, 10–11 July.
Ortúzar, J. de D. (2016) State of practice and future challenges in strategic transport planning. 16th Chinese Overseas Transport Association (COTA) International Conference of Transportation Professionals (CICTP2016), Shanghai, 5–9 July.

External links 

 Personal homepage on Pontifical Catholic University website
Profile on Institute for Transport Studies
 Pontifical Catholic University of Chile
 UC Department of Transportation and Logistics Engineering
 Centre of Excellence Bus Rapid Transit
 Centre for Sustainable Urban Development
 Institute in Complex Engineering Systems
 Scientific and Technological Research of the Pontifical Catholic University of Chile
 Chilean Society of Transport Engineering
 Google Scholar

1949 births
Living people
Alumni of the University of Leeds
Academic staff of the Pontifical Catholic University of Chile